Calcyclin-binding protein is a protein that in humans is encoded by the CACYBP gene.

The protein encoded by this gene is a calcyclin binding protein. It may be involved in calcium-dependent ubiquitination and subsequent proteosomal degradation of target proteins. It probably serves as a molecular bridge in ubiquitin E3 complexes and participates in the ubiquitin-mediated degradation of beta-catenin. Two alternatively spliced transcript variants encoding different isoforms have been found for this gene.

Protein Interactions 

CACYBP has been shown to interact with SKP1A and SIAH1. 

The CacyBP/SIP complex instead, is known to be a part of stress respons, since it interacts with chaperone HSP90.

References

External links

Further reading